The gray leaf-eared mouse (Graomys griseoflavus) is a rodent species from South America. It is found in Argentina, Bolivia, Brazil and Paraguay; its habitat includes the Gran Chaco.

This is a variable and widely distributed species that can be found in many habitat types. It is considered to be a species complex, and some populations might be considered separate species.
 Genus Graomys contains species once considered to be part of the complex.

Notes

References

Graomys
Rodents of South America
Mammals of Argentina
Mammals of Bolivia
Mammals of Brazil
Mammals of Paraguay
Mammals described in 1837